St. Gregorious College of Engineering, Devalokam is a college in Perla, Kasaragod District, India.

Recognition
The college is affiliated to Kannur University

Courses Conducted
 B.Tech. Computer Science & Engineering
 B.Tech. Electronics & Comm. Engineering 
 B.Tech. Electrical & Electronics Engineering
 B.Tech.  Mechanical Engineering 
 B.Tech. Civil Engineering

References

Colleges affiliated to Kannur University
Colleges in Kasaragod district
Engineering colleges in Kerala